The fundamental accounting equation, also called the balance sheet equation, represents the relationship between the assets, liabilities, and owner's equity of a person or business. It is the foundation for the double-entry bookkeeping system. For each transaction, the total debits equal the total credits. It can be expressed as furthermore:

 

 
 

In a corporation, capital represents the stockholders' equity. Since every business transaction affects at least two of a company's accounts, the accounting equation will always be "in balance", meaning the left side of its balance sheet should always equal the right side. Thus, the accounting formula essentially shows that what the firm owns (its assets) has been purchased with equity and/or liabilities.  That is, with funds it has borrowed and therefore owes (its liabilities) plus funds invested by the founding shareholders (its shareholders' equity or capital); note that the profits earned by the company ultimately belong to its owners.

The formula can be rewritten:

Assets − Liabilities = (Shareholders' or Owners' Equity)

Now it shows owners' equity is equal to property (assets) minus debts (liabilities). Since in a corporation owners are shareholders, owner's equity is called shareholders' equity.
Every accounting transaction affects at least one element of the equation, but always balances. Simple transactions also include:

These are some simple examples, but even the most complicated transactions can be recorded in a similar way. This equation is behind debits, credits, and journal entries.

This equation is part of the transaction analysis model, for which we also write

Owner's equity = Contributed Capital + Retained Earnings

Retained Earnings = Net Income − Dividends

and
Net Income = Revenue − Expenses

The equation resulting from making these substitutions in the accounting equation may be referred to as the expanded accounting equation, because it yields the breakdown of the equity component of the equation.

Assets = Liabilities + Contributed Capital + Revenue − Expenses − Dividends

Applications
The accounting equation is fundamental to the double-entry bookkeeping practice. Its applications in accountancy and economics are thus diverse.

Financial statement
A company's quarterly and annual reports are basically derived directly from the accounting equations used in bookkeeping practices. These equations, entered in a business's general ledger, will provide the material that eventually makes up the foundation of a business's financial statements. This includes expense reports, cash flow and salary and company investments.

Double entry bookkeeping system 
The accounting equation plays a significant role as the foundation of the double-entry bookkeeping system. The primary aim of the double-entry system is to keep track of debits and credits and ensure that the sum of these always matches up to the company assets, a calculation carried out by the accounting equation. It is based on the idea that each transaction has an equal effect. It is used to transfer totals from books of prime entry into the nominal ledger. Every transaction is recorded twice so that the debit is balanced by a credit.

Income and retained earnings 
The income and retained earnings of the accounting equation is also an essential component in computing, understanding, and analyzing a firm's income statement. This statement reflects profits and losses that are themselves determined by the calculations that make up the basic accounting equation. In other words, this equation allows businesses to determine revenue as well as prepare a statement of retained earnings. This then allows them to predict future profit trends and adjust business practices accordingly. Thus, the accounting equation is an essential step in determining company profitability.

Company worth
Since the balance sheet is founded on the principles of the accounting equation, this equation can also be said to be responsible for estimating the net worth of an entire company. The fundamental components of the accounting equation include the calculation of both company holdings and company debts; thus, it allows owners to gauge the total value of a firm's assets.

However, due to the fact that accounting is kept on a historical basis, the equity is typically not the net worth of the organization. Often, a company may depreciate capital assets in 5–7 years, meaning that the assets will show on the books as less than their "real" value, or what they would be worth on the secondary market.

Investments
Due to its role in determining a firm's net worth, the accounting equation is an important tool for investors looking to measure a company's holdings and debts at any particular time, and frequent calculations can indicate how steady or erratic a business's financial dealings might be. This provides valuable information to creditors or banks that might be considering a loan application or investment in the company.

References

Accounting terminology